Anarete is a genus of midges in the family Cecidomyiidae. There are 38 described species. The genus was established by Irish entomologist Alexander Henry Haliday in 1833 and has a cosmopolitan distribution.

Species
Anarete albipennis Loew, 1845
Anarete allahabadensis Grover, 1964
Anarete anepsia Pritchard, 1951
Anarete angusta Mo & Xu, 2009
Anarete basmatensis Bhalerao, Shaikh & Deshpande, 2009
Anarete bharati Bhalerao, Shaikh & Deshpande, 2009
Anarete bipartita Jaschhof & Jaschhof, 2011
Anarete buscki (Felt, 1915)
Anarete candidata Haliday, 1833
Anarete conaretoides Jaschhof & Jaschhof, 2011
Anarete corni (Felt, 1907)
Anarete cornoata Mamaev, 1964
Anarete diervillae (Felt, 1907)
Anarete edwardsi Pritchard, 1951
Anarete felti Pritchard, 1951
Anarete flavitarsis Mamaev, 1964
Anarete iridis (Cockerell, 1914)
Anarete jagdyevi Mamaev, 1986
Anarete johnsoni (Felt, 1908)
Anarete lacteipennis Kieffer, 1906
Anarete longipalpi Bhalerao, Shaikh & Deshpande, 2009
Anarete mamajevi Berest, 1987
Anarete manii Rao, 1953
Anarete medicaginis Mamaev, 1963
Anarete pallida Edwards, 1928
Anarete perplexia Gagne, 2004
Anarete pilipennis Strobl, 1910
Anarete pritchardi Kim, 1967
Anarete rubra Kieffer, 1906
Anarete serena Berest, 2000
Anarete sitapurensis Grover, 1970
Anarete stettinensis Enderlein, 1911
Anarete taimyrensis Mamaev, 1990
Anarete tashanensis Mo & Xiao, 2004
Anarete triarthra Edwards, 1938
Anarete trilobata Najam, Siddique & Deshpande, 2008
Anarete vishnupurensis Najam, Siddique & Deshpande, 2008
Anarete zhengi B & Li, 2001

References

Cecidomyiidae genera

Insects described in 1833
Taxa named by Alexander Henry Haliday